Endotricha flavofascialis is a species of snout moth in the genus Endotricha. It is found in Russia and Japan.

Subspecies
Endotricha flavofascialis flavofascialis (south-eastern Siberia)
Endotricha flavofascialis affinialis South, 1901 (Japan)

References

Moths described in 1864
Endotrichini
Moths of Japan